Saint Ann's School is a private school in Brooklyn, New York City that is ranked one of the top high schools in the United States (by the Wall Street Journal). The school is a non-sectarian, co-educational pre-K–12 day school with programs in the arts, humanities, and sciences (its high school offers 200+ classes yearly).

The students number 1,012 from preschool through 12th grade, as well as 324 faculty, administration, and staff members.

The campus, located in the Brooklyn Heights neighborhood of Brooklyn, includes a central 15-story building with a 19th-century facade housing the 4th through 12th grades; a lower school building for the first through third grades; two adjoining brownstones, one of which houses the school's fine arts department; and a preschool and kindergarten located near the main campus. Annual tuition as of 2022 is between $48,000 and $52,000 depending on grade level.

History

Saint Ann's School was founded in 1965 with 63 students and seven teachers in the basement of the St. Ann's Episcopal Church under the aegis of the vestry of the church and several interested parents. In 1966, the Church purchased the former Crescent Athletic Club House, a building designed by noted Brooklyn architect Frank Freeman, for the sum of $365,000, which has since served as the school's main building.

Stanley Bosworth (1927–2011) became its first headmaster. In 1982, Saint Ann's School formally disaffiliated from the church, having been granted a charter from the Board of Regents of the State of New York. When Bosworth retired in 2004, Larry Weiss, formerly the head of the upper school at The Horace Mann School, American University scholar, and president at Friends World College, began his tenure as head of school at Saint Ann's. In September 2009, it was announced that Weiss would not return to Saint Ann's for the 2010–2011 academic year. In May 2010, Vincent J. Tompkins Jr., the Deputy Provost at Brown University, and formerly associate dean of academic affairs at Harvard University, was named Weiss's successor. A graduate of Brown, he received his PhD from Harvard, and taught American history there before entering academic administration. He assumed leadership of Saint Ann's beginning with the 2010–2011 academic year.

Academic program
The school allows its high school juniors and seniors to essentially design their own curriculum.  Advanced Placement courses are not offered at Saint Ann's.

In a 2004 survey conducted by The Wall Street Journal, Saint Ann's was rated the number one high school in the country for having the highest percentage of graduating seniors enroll in Ivy League and several other highly selective colleges. In late 2007, The Wall Street Journal again listed Saint Ann's as one of the country's top 50 high schools for its success in preparing students to enter top American universities. In 2012, the New York Observer ranked Saint Ann's as the number one high school in New York City.

Arts

The school's visual and performing arts program includes:
 Film, Animation, video, & photography
 Playwriting, acting, theater production, & costume design & construction
 Architecture
 Mathematical Art
 Drawing, sculpture, painting, conceptual art & printmaking
 Puppet construction
 Modern dance, jazz dance, & African dance
 Mathematics of Music, Electronic music, Brass Choir, Chamber Orchestra, Consort, Chorus, chamber music, jazz band, Bach Ensemble, music theory, modern music, Jazz Techniques, Jazz Guitar, Percussion Ensemble, Wind Ensemble, Music Theory and Composition, Music and Computers, The Broadway Musical, Jazz History, Opera, and an African balafon ensemble in the Lower School
Performance Art

Sciences and Mathematics 
The expansive sciences and math offerings at Saint Ann's include:

Computer Science:

 Computer Science Programming
 Graphics Programming
 Physical Computing 
 Algorithms for Bioinformatics
 AI Machine Learning
Math:
 Advanced Statistics
 Linear Algebra
 Non-Euclidean Geometry
 Formal Logic
 Number Theory
Science:
 Advanced Physiology
 Modern Genetics
 Neuropsychology
 Organic Chemistry
 Oceanography and Meteorology
 Astronomy
 Introduction to Quantum Mechanics
 Independent Science Research

Languages

Saint Ann's offers courses in:
Ancient Greek
Latin
Mandarin Chinese
Japanese
Spanish
French

Seminar 
Unique seminar classes are offered every year, with past subjects including The Art of Debate and Rhetoric, Mock Trial, The Math Behind Finance, Philosophical Ethics, Radicalism and Dissent in America, Advanced Architecture & Design.

Divisions and demographics 
The school is organized into four divisions: preschool, lower, middle and high school. The vast majority of the students are from Brooklyn and Manhattan, although other boroughs are represented. Approximately 22 percent of the student body receive some level of scholarship aid (8.5 percent receive tuition remission; 13.5 percent receive financial aid). Approximately 33 percent of the student body are nonwhite.

Faculty and alumni

The school maintains a list called The Growing Shelf, which documents all published community members.

Notable faculty
 Pearl Abraham (novelist)
 Staceyann Chin (poet and LGBT activist)
 Mark Denbeaux (lawyer)
 Jonathan Elliott (composer)
 Oskar Eustis (artistic director of Public Theater)
 William Everdell (historian) 
 Melissa James Gibson (playwright)
 Adam Gidwitz (author) 
 Laura Gilbert (Grammy Award-winning flutist)
Jonathan Hafetz (lawyer)
 Cara Hoffman (writer)
 Paul Lockhart (mathematician and author of A Mathematician's Lament and Measurement)
 Willard Midgette (artist)
Anne Pierson Wiese (poet)
 Leon Reid IV (artist)
 Colette Rossant (author)
Greg Smith (artist)
 Dave Schramm, (musician)
 Tazewell Thompson (theater director)
 Heather A. Williams (historian)

Notable alumni

Actors
Jon Abrahams
Eva Amurri
Jennifer Connelly
Paz de la Huerta
Caitlin Dulany
Cyrus Dunham
Lena Dunham
Alexis Dziena
India Ennenga
Michael Esper
Josh Hamilton
 Fred Hechinger
Lucas Hedges
Michelle Hurd
Monica Keena
Jemima Kirke
Lola Kirke
Stephen Mailer
Griffin Newman
Mia Sara
Eric Stuart
Maya Hawke
Filmmakers and screenwriters
Akiva Goldsman (screenwriter)
Ry Russo-Young (director)
Lena Dunham
Jonás Cuarón (screenwriter)
Dan Goor (screenwriter)
Immy Humes (documentary filmmaker)
Garret Linn (filmmaker)
Sarah-Violet Bliss (filmmaker)
Musicians and writers
Michael Diamond
Stefan Zeniuk (musician)
Barbara Brousal (musician)
Vera Sola (musician, singer-songwriter, poet)
Dan Coleman (composer)
Simone Dinnerstein (pianist)
Tomás Doncker (guitarist)
Erika Nickrenz (pianist)
Jeff Yang (author, journalist)
Anna Ziegler (playwright)
Meghan O'Rourke (poet)
Anne Midgette (journalist) 
Sasha Frere-Jones (writer/music critic)
Jaida Jones (fantasy author)
Thomas Beller (author and editor)
Rebecca Pronsky (singer-songwriter)
Zoë Jenny (writer)
Emma Straub (writer) 
John Pomfret (journalist)
Ivy Pochoda (novelist)
Victoria Kann, author of the Pinkalicious book series
Joanna Fuhrman (poet)
Alissa Quart (poet)
Ann Herendeen (writer)
Lynn Nottage (playwright)
Sam Sifton (journalist)
Samantha Gillison (writer)
Eliza Callahan (singer)
Lucy Wainwright Roche (singer-songwriter)
Dan Brenner (musician)
Other notables
Zac Posen (fashion designer)
Katherine Healy (figure skater/ballerina)
Meredith Rainey (athlete),
Adam Bosworth (technology engineer)
Willa Shalit (entrepreneur)
Vito Schnabel (art curator)
Benjamin B. Wagner (attorney)
Daniel Weinreb (computer scientist) 
Christopher Bouton (technologist)
Jean-Michel Basquiat (artist)
Risa L. Goluboff (law professor) 
Derrick Niederman (mathematician and author)
Tobias Frere-Jones (type designer){cit}
Chitra Ganesh (artist)
Kate Shepherd (artist)
Justine Cassell (professor)
Christian Martin (television executive)
Bernadette Meyler (Stanford Law School professor)
Heather A. Williams (historian)

See also

 Education in New York City

References

External links

 

Private elementary schools in Brooklyn
Private middle schools in Brooklyn
Private high schools in Brooklyn
Preparatory schools in New York City
Educational institutions established in 1965
1965 establishments in New York City